Navajos Film Themselves is a series of seven short documentary films which show scenes of life on the Navajo Nation. It was added to the United States National Film Registry in 2002.

The films are:
 Intrepid Shadows directed by Al Clah
 The Navajo Silversmith directed by John Nelson
 A Navajo Weaver directed by Susie Benally
 Old Antelope Lake directed by Mike Anderson
 Second Weaver directed by either Susie Benally or Alta Kahn
 The Shallow Well Project directed by John Nelson
 The Spirit of the Navajos directed by Maxine and Mary J. Tsosie

The series is also known as Through Navajo Eyes, due to a confusion with the book that follows.

See Through Navajo Eyes: An exploration in film communication and anthropology. (1972) by John Adair and Sol Worth, (with an introduction by Richard Chalfen in the 1996 edition).  978-0826317711

Original elements for these films are stored at the Library of Congress, Culpeper, Virginia.

External links
 Official site

1966 films
United States National Film Registry films
Documentary films about Native Americans
1960s short documentary films
Navajo Nation